Black or White is a 2014 American drama film written and directed by Mike Binder. The film stars Kevin Costner, Octavia Spencer, Jillian Estell, Bill Burr, Jennifer Ehle, Andre Holland, Gillian Jacobs, and Anthony Mackie. The film premiered at the 2014 Toronto International Film Festival and was released in the United States on January 30, 2015.

Premise
Elliot Anderson is widowed after a car crash leads to the death of his wife. At the funeral, Rowena, his granddaughter Eloise's paternal grandmother, offers to care for Eloise, but Elliot angrily declines. Elliot raises his granddaughter as he struggles with his grief by binge-drinking. Elliot's world is turned upside-down when Rowena demands that Eloise be brought under the care of her father Reggie, Rowena's son, who is addicted to drugs and whom Elliot blames for the negligence that led to the death of his own daughter. Elliot finds himself deeply entrenched in a custody battle and will stop at nothing to keep his granddaughter from coming under the watch of her reckless father.

Cast

Production 
On September 25, 2014, Open Road Films was in talks to acquire the US distribution rights to the film. On October 17, Relativity Media acquired the US rights to the film.

A thousand girls auditioned for the part of Eloise.

Costner financed the film using his own money.

Post production 
Principal photography  of the film began on July 15, 2013, in New Orleans with the filming lasting for five weeks.

Release 
Relativity planned to release the film in time to qualify for the Oscar race, starting with a limited release on December 3, 2014, then opening wide on January 30, 2015.

Home media 
Black or White was released on Blu-ray and DVD on May 5, 2015.

Reception

Box office
Black or White grossed $21.6 million in North America against a budget of $9 million.

In its opening weekend of January 30, 2015, the film made a gross of $2.3 million on Friday, $3 million on Saturday, and $986,312 on Sunday for a weekend total of $6.2 million, playing in 1,823 with a per-theater average of $3,408 and ranking #4.

Critical response
Black or White received mixed reviews from critics. On Rotten Tomatoes, the film holds a 39% rating, based on 102 reviews, with an average rating of 5.19/10. The website's consensus reads: "Black or White has more on its mind than your average family drama, but the film's approach to its thought-provoking themes too often lives down to its title." On Metacritic, the film has a score of 45 out of 100, based on 30 critics, indicating "mixed or average reviews". Audiences polled by CinemaScore gave the film an average grade of "A−" on an A+ to F scale.

Jordan Mintzer of The Hollywood Reporter wrote: "Black and White never panders too easily to sentiments, creating characters who are riddled with flaws but likeable all the same." 
Scott Foundas of Variety praised Costner for his performance calling it "some of the finest, most deeply felt work of his career" but was critical of the film "this well-intentioned family drama never quite shakes free from its didactic, movie-of-the-week dramaturgy and a hand-holding approach to race-relations."

References

External links 
 

2014 films
2014 drama films
2010s English-language films
Films about alcoholism
Films about lawyers
Films about race and ethnicity
Films directed by Mike Binder
Films set in Los Angeles
Films shot in Los Angeles
Films shot in New Orleans
Relativity Media films
Sunlight Productions films
Films scored by Terence Blanchard
African-American drama films
2010s American films